The Levitated Dipole Experiment (LDX) was an experiment investigating the generation of fusion power using the concept of a levitated dipole. The device was the first of its kind to test the levitated dipole concept and was funded by the US Department of Energy.  The machine was also part of a collaboration between the MIT Plasma Science and Fusion Center and Columbia University, where another dipole experiment, the Collisionless Terrella Experiment (CTX), was located.

LDX ceased operations in November 2011 when its funding from the Department of Energy ended as resources were being diverted to tokamak research.

Concept and development 

The concept of the levitated dipole as a fusion reactor was first theorized by Akira Hasegawa in 1987. The concept was later proposed as an experiment by Jay Kesner of MIT and Michael Mauel of Columbia University in 1997. The pair assembled a team and raised money to build the machine. They achieved first plasma on Friday, August 13, 2004 at 12:53 PM. First plasma was done by (1) successfully levitating the dipole magnet and (2) RF heating the plasma. The LDX team has since successfully conducted several levitation tests, including a 40-minute suspension of the superconducting coil on February 9, 2007. Shortly after, the coil was damaged in a control test in February 2007 and replaced in May 2007. The replacement coil was inferior, a copper wound electromagnet, that was also water cooled. Scientific results, including the observation of an inward turbulent pinch, were reported in Nature Physics.

The Machine

The Dipole 
This experiment needed a very special free-floating electromagnet, which created the unique "toilet-bowl" magnetic field. The magnetic field was originally made of two counter-wound rings of currents. Each ring contained a 19-strand niobium-tin Rutherford cable (common in superconducting magnets). These looped around inside an Inconel magnet; a magnet that looked like an oversized donut. The donut was charged using induction. Once charged, it generated a magnetic field for roughly an 8-hour period. Overall, the ring weighed 450 kilograms and levitated 1.6 meters above a superconducting ring. The ring produced roughly a 5-tesla field. This superconductor was encased inside a liquid helium, which kept the electromagnet below 10 kelvins. This design is similar to the D20 dipole experiment at Berkeley and the RT-1 experiment at the University of Tokyo.

Chamber 
The dipole was suspended inside a mushroom-shaped vacuum chamber, which was about 5 meters in diameter and ~3 meters high. At the base of the chamber was a charging coil. This coil is used to charge the dipole, using induction. The coil exposing the dipole to a varying magnetic field. Next, the dipole is raised into the center of the chamber. This could be done with supports or using the field itself. Around the outside of this chamber were Helmholtz coils, which were used to produce a uniform surrounding magnetic field. This external field would interact with the dipole field, suspending the dipole. It was in this surrounding field that plasma moved. The plasma forms around the dipole and inside the chamber. The plasma is formed by heating a low pressure gas. The gas is heated using a radio frequency, essentially microwaving the plasma in a 17-kilowatt field.

The Diagnostics 

The machine was monitored using diagnostics fairly standard to all of fusion. These included: 
 A Flux loop. This is a loop of wire. The magnetic field passes through the wire loop. As the field varied inside the loop, it generated a current. This was measured and from the signal the magnetic flux was measured. 
 An X-ray detector. This diagnostic measured the X-rays emitted. From this, the plasmas' temperature was found. There were four of these inside the machine, each measuring along a cord (or line out) inside the machine. This detector was good for measuring electrons, typically around 100 electron-volts. All plasma loses energy by emitting light. This covers the whole spectrum: visible, IR, UV, and X-rays. This occurs anytime a particle changes speed, for any reason. If the reason is deflection by a magnetic field, the radiation is Cyclotron radiation at low speeds and Synchrotron radiation at high speeds. If the reason is deflection by another particle, plasma radiates X-rays, known as Bremsstrahlung radiation.
 An X-ray Camera. This can read lower energy X-rays. 
 A Conventional Video Camera 
 An emissive Langmuir probe. A Langmuir probe is a wire, stuck into a plasma, which absorbs the surrounding charged particles. You can vary the voltage on this wire. As the voltage changes, the charged particles absorbed change, making an IV curve. This can be read and used to measure the density and temperature of the nearby plasma. 
 A triple Langmuir probe
 A dozen Langmuir probes grouped together

Behavior 

Single particles corkscrew along the field lines, flowing around the dipole electromagnet. This leads to a giant encapsulation of the electromagnet. As material passes through the center, the density spikes. This is because much plasma is trying to squeeze through a limited area. This is where most of the fusion reactions occur. This behavior has been called a turbulent pinch.  
  
In large amounts, the plasma formed two shells around the dipole: a low-density shell, occupying a large volume and a high-density shell, closer to the dipole. This is shown here. The plasma was trapped fairly well. It gave a maximum beta number of 0.26. A value of 1 is ideal.

Modes of Operation 
There were two modes of operation observed: 
 Hot electron interchange: a lower density, mostly electron plasma.
 A more conventional Magnetohydrodynamic mode
These had been proposed by Nicholas Krall in the 1960s.

Tritium Suppression 
In the case of deuterium fusion (the cheapest and most straightforward fusion fuel) the geometry of the LDX has the unique advantage over other concepts. Deuterium fusion makes two products, that occur with near equal probability:

D + D -> T + ^1H
D + D -> ^3He + n

In this machine, the secondary tritium could be partially removed, a unique property of the dipole. Another fuel choice is tritium and deuterium. This reaction can be done at lower heats and pressures. But it has several drawbacks. First, tritium is far more expensive than deuterium. This is because tritium is rare. It has a short half-life making it hard to produce and store. It is also considered a hazardous material, so using it is a hassle from a health, safety and environmental perspective. Finally, tritium and deuterium produces fast neutrons which means any reactor burning it would require heavy shielding.

References

External links 
MIT's LDX website
Discovery Tech report on LDX (6/08), "Power from a floating metal donut"

Magnetic confinement fusion devices
Columbia University
Massachusetts Institute of Technology